Kalateh-ye Ryisi (also Romanized as Kalāteh-ye Ryīsī; also known as Kalāteh-ye Ra’īs, Kalāt-e Ra’īs, Kalāteh, Kalāteh Rāīs, Ra’īs, and Re’īs Kalāteh) is a village in Meyghan Rural District, in the Central District of Nehbandan County, South Khorasan Province, Iran. At the 2006 census, its population was 57, in 18 families.

References 

Populated places in Nehbandan County